WILE-FM (97.7 MHz) is a commercial FM radio station licensed to Byesville, Ohio, and serving Guernsey County, including the city of Cambridge. The station is owned by AVC Communications and broadcasts a Soft Oldies - Adult Standards radio format.  

WILE-FM features programming from Westwood One's "America's Best Music" network. It also carries college football and basketball games from the Ohio State Sports Network.

History
The station went on the air as WUFA on 30 July 1992. On 26 August 1994, it changed its call sign to the current WILE.

References

External links
 Official Website
 

ILE-FM
Adult standards radio stations in the United States
Radio stations established in 1992